In April 1900, Professor L. A. Grosclaude of Geneva proposed the Invariable Calendar, New Era Calendar, or Normal Calendar with 12 months and four 91-day quarters of exactly 13 weeks. An additional day, termed New Year's Day, that was not any day of the week and not part of any month, would occur between December 31 and January 1. Another such day is inserted between June 31 and July 1 on leap years.

This model would be a perennial calendar, with each date occurring perennially on the same day of the week. Grosclaude lists many business advantages to this. Three monthly days important to businesses, the 1st, 15th, and 30th would always occur on the same 3 days of the week, respectively, and additionally would never occur on a Sunday, for example. It became the model for The World Calendar, promoted by Elisabeth Acheils and The World Calendar Association since 1930.

Proposed Calendar

Criticism 
 The Sabbatarian objection, that the strict cycle of the seven-day week is interrupted; sometimes there are seven days between sabbaths, instead of the usual six.
 Difficulties of defining the dates of New Year's and Leap Days when they don't belong to any month or week.

Other calendars and proposals 

 List of calendars: Reform calendars
 Calendar reform: Specific proposals
 Armelin's calendar

Sources 

 A Proposed Plan For An Invariable Calendar, Sunday Magazine, David Friedman, June 25, 2010 at 9:02 am, PDF
 A PROPOSED PLAN FOR AN INVARIABLE CALENDAR, June 26, 1910, The New York Times, Hedley P. Somner, PDF
 The Reform of the Calendar, Popular Astronomy, vol. 20, pp. 232–236, 04/1912, Ralph E. Wilson, PDF
 The Reform of the Calendar, Publications of the Astronomical Society of the Pacific, Vol. 24, No. 141, p. 113, PDF
 Wanted—A Brand-New Calendar, Popular Science, Jan 1927, pp. 33–34, 134-135, Frank Parker Stockbridge
 THE REFORM OF THE CALENDAR, ALEXANDER PHILIP, 1914, Diagram, PDF

Proposed calendars